The Hancock Apartment Building. also known as the Schaffer Apartments, is a historic mixed-used retail and residential apartment building at 116-118 Hancock Street and 130 Tyler Street on the east side of Springfield, Massachusetts.  Built in 1912, it is good local example of an early 20th-century Classical Revival apartment house, built as the city's outer neighborhoods grew as streetcar suburbs. The building was listed on the National Register of Historic Places in 2015.

Description and history
The Hancock Apartment Building is located in Springfield's Old Hill neighborhood, at the northwest corner of Tyler and Hancock Streets.  It is a four-story brick structure, with an exterior of orange brick, a pressed metal cornice, and a flat roof.  Decorative brick banding joins the tops of the windows, and runs just below the sills of the upper-level windows.  Some of the upper-level windows are set in decorative metal panels in groups of three.  The building underwent a certified historic rehabilitation in 2014, in which interior features such as trim and pressed metal ceilings were preserved.

The building was constructed in 1911-12 to a design by Burton E. Geckler, a local architect whose works include apartment blocks like this, single-family residences, commercial buildings, and churches both in Springfield and nearby Longmeadow.  It was built for Tessie Schaffer & Company, a consortium of eastern European Jewish immigrants.  It originally housed a dry goods store in the corner retail space.  Many of the early residents were either native-born Americans or French-Canadian immigrants.

See also
National Register of Historic Places listings in Springfield, Massachusetts
National Register of Historic Places listings in Hampden County, Massachusetts

References

Apartment buildings on the National Register of Historic Places in Massachusetts
National Register of Historic Places in Springfield, Massachusetts
Apartment buildings in Springfield, Massachusetts
1912 establishments in Massachusetts